H1 is a para-cycling classification. It includes people with a number of disability types including spinal cord injuries and cerebral palsy. Handcycles that can be used by people in races include the AP2 recumbent and AP3 recumbent. The classification competes at the Paralympic Games and has international rankings done by the UCI.

Definition

Union Cycliste Internationale (UCI) defines H1 as:
 Tetraplegia C6 or above and severe athetosis/ataxia/dystonia
 Tetraplegic with impairments corresponding to a complete cervical lesion at C6 or above
 Complete loss of trunk stability and lower limb function
 Limited extension of the elbow with a muscle score of 6 (total of both tri- ceps)
 Limited handgrip
 Non-spinal cord injury, but functional ability profile equivalent to sport class H 1.1
 Impaired sympathetic nerve system
 Recumbent position in handbike mandatory (AP-bikes)
 Severe athetosis/ataxia/dystonia and elbow extension limitation
 Asymmetric or symmetric quadriplegia with at least grade 3 spasticity in upper limbs and lower limbs.
The UCI recommends this be coded as  MH1 or WH1.

Disability groups 

People with cerebral palsy are one of the classes eligible to compete in this class, including CP/ISRA CP2 classified cyclists. All CP2 cyclists are required to wear a helmet, with a special color used to designate their class.  Their helmet color is red.

CP2 cyclists tend to use electric wheelchairs in everyday life.  They may have controlled shakes and twitches.  This bodily activity can spike their metabolic rate.  They can operate a manual wheelchair but this is restricted because of motor control issues.  Functional control issues effect all or most of their limbs. When participating in sport, CP2 competitors tend to have low energy expenditure.

The cycle

This classification can use an AP2 recumbent, which is a competition cycle that is reclined at 30 degrees and has a rigid frame.  This classification can also use an AP3 hand cycle which is inclined at 0 degrees and is reclined on a rigid competition frame.

Classification history
Cycling first became a Paralympic sport at the 1988 Summer Paralympics. In September 2006, governance for para-cycling passed from the International Paralympic Committee's International Cycling Committee to UCI at a meeting in Switzerland.  When this happened, the responsibility of classifying the sport also changed.

At the Paralympic Games 
For the 2016 Summer Paralympics in Rio, the International Paralympic Committee had a zero classification at the Games policy.  This policy was put into place in 2014, with the goal of avoiding last minute changes in classes that would negatively impact athlete training preparations. All competitors needed to be internationally classified with their classification status confirmed prior to the Games, with exceptions to this policy being dealt with on a case-by-case basis.

Rankings
The following are the men's rankings for this classification :

Becoming classified
Classification is handled by Union Cycliste Internationale. Classification for the UCI Para-Cycling World Championships is completed by at least two classification panels.  Members of the classification panel must not have a relationship with the cyclist and must not be involved in the World Championships in any other role than as classifier.  In national competitions, the classification is handled by the national cycling federation.  Classification often has three components: physical, technical and observation assessment.

References

Para-cycling classification
Parasports classifications